The Tinthiinae are a subfamily of clearwing moths, first established in 1917 by Ferdinand Le Cerf.

Tribes and genera
Tinthiinae consists of twenty-four genera across four tribes:

Tinthiini 
 Microsphecia Bartel 1912
 Tinthia Walker [1865]
 Sophona Walker 1856
 Zenodoxus Grote & Robinson 1868
 Conopsia Strand [1913]
 Paranthrenopsis Le Cerf 1911
 Entrichella Bryk 1947
 Negotinthia Gorbunov 2001
 Trichocerota Hampson [1893a]
 Paradoxecia Hampson 1919
 Rectala Bryk 1947
 Tyrictaca Walker 1862
 Caudicornia Bryk 1947
 Bidentotinthia Arita & Gorbunov 2003
 Tarsotinthia Arita & Gorbunov 2003

Pennisetiini 
 Pennisetia Dehne 1850
 Corematosetia Kallies & Arita 2001

Paraglosseciini
 Oligophlebia Hampson [1893]
 Isothamnis Meyrick 1935
 Cyanophlebia Arita & Gorbunov 2001
 Lophocnema Turner 1917
 Diapyra Turner 1917

Similipepsini 
 Similipepsis Le Cerf 1911
 Gasterostena Arita & Gorbunov 2003

References 

Moth subfamilies
Sesiidae